Covell is a surname. Notable people with the surname include:

Charlie Covell (born 1984), British actress, writer and producer
Daniel Covell (born 1970), American professional wrestler
John Collins Covell (1823–1887), American educator and school administrator
Louis Chapin Covell (1875-1952), American military officer and salesman
Luke Covell (born 1981), Australian-New Zealand professional rugby league footballer
Phyllis Covell (1895–1982), English tennis player
Ralph Covell (1911–1988), English architect
Roger Covell (born 1931), Australian musicologist, critic and author
Thomas Covell ( - 1639), keeper of Lancaster Castle and mayor of Lancaster six times.
William Covell (died 1613), English clergyman and writer
Ralph R Covell (1922-2013) - American missionary to China and Professor of Missions

See also
Covell, Illinois, unincorporated community in Dale Township, McLean County, Illinois, United States
Covell, former name of Easton, California
Covel (disambiguation)